Chhattisgarh is central state of the union of India. It is known for its cultural heritage.

List of Folktales of Chhattisgarh

The List of Folktales of Chhattisgarh is 
 Mohna de gori kayina
 Dhola Maru
 Fox and Mahadev
 Sada Brij Saaranga
 Vikramāditya as Bikai
 Vikramāditya with Manwa-Patwa
Satvantin
Thag and Big
Kalidas and Vidyamati 
Bhalnin
Khirmit
Belva Kayina
Paidhna Paidhneen
Vikramāditya Brings Amrit
Jheek Jheek
Two Sadhus visiting a family and a couple
Lal Bujakkad
Raja Bhoj
Raja Nal and Mata Damyanti
Loric Chanda
Dasmat Kayina
Old Woman and Prawn

References

External links 
 Chhattisgarhi folk tales Ahiman Kaina

Culture of Chhattisgarh
Chhattisgarh
Indian culture-related lists
Chhattisgarh-related lists